Princess Margaretha, Mrs. Ambler (Margaretha Désirée Victoria; born 31 October 1934), is a Swedish princess, the eldest sister of King Carl XVI Gustaf of Sweden and also a first cousin of Queen Margrethe II of Denmark.

Early life

Margaretha was born on 31 October 1934 at Haga Palace in Haga Park, Stockholm, as the first child of Prince Gustaf Adolf, Duke of Västerbotten, and his wife Princess Sibylla of Saxe-Coburg-Gotha; paternal granddaughter of Crown Prince Gustaf Adolf of Sweden and his late wife Princess Margaret of Connaught; maternal granddaughter of Prince Charles Edward, Duke of Saxe-Coburg and Gotha, and his wife Princess Victoria Adelaide of Schleswig-Holstein; she was born during the reign of her paternal great-grandfather King Gustav V of Sweden. In January 1947, her father died in an airplane crash.

Although the eldest child, as a female, she was never in line to the throne according to the Swedish constitution current at the time. She was educated privately at the Haga Palace and then at the Stockholm dressmaking school, Märthaskolan (Martha School).

Courtship and marriage

In the 1950s Margaretha had a relationship with Robin Douglas-Home, a Scottish aristocrat and the nephew of the future Prime Minister of the United Kingdom Alec Douglas-Home. He came to visit her in Sweden, but they never married. There was speculation in the press that this was due to Sibylla forbidding the match, but Margaretha's nanny and confidante Ingrid Björnberg states categorically in her memoirs that the breakup between the two was caused by Margaretha's reluctance to enter into an engagement with Douglas-Home.

She met her future husband, the businessman John Ambler, ten years her elder, at a dinner party in the United Kingdom in 1963 and their engagement was announced on 28 February 1964. They were married on 30 June 1964, in Gärdslösa Church, on the island of Öland. The Princess wore a wedding gown from the Stockholm couture school, Märthaskolan, where she had previously been a student, and a traditional wedding crown from Öland.

The couple for a time let Winslow Hall in Buckinghamshire. They settled at Chippinghurst Manor in Oxfordshire. As a result of her unequal marriage, she lost her style of Royal Highness and the King gave her the courtesy title of Princess Margaretha, Mrs. Ambler. Under the Swedish constitution of that time, she, as a woman, and her descendants were not eligible to inherit the throne. Thus they still are not.

Ambler and her husband separated in 1994, but never divorced.  He died on 31 May 2008.

Margaretha and John Ambler's marriage produced three children: Sybilla (b. 1965), Edward (b. 1966), and James (b. 1969). Her daughter married Baron Henning von Dincklage and has two children, of whom Madeleine Charlotte Margaretha von Dincklage is the goddaughter of Crown Princess Victoria of Sweden and was a bridesmaid at her wedding.

Later life
In June 1960, Margaretha, with her first cousin Princess Margrethe of Denmark and her second cousin once removed Princess Astrid of Norway, toured the United States on the occasion of the first transatlantic flight by Scandinavian Airlines.  During their visit, the three Scandinavian princesses toured Disneyland and Hollywood and also visited Paramount Pictures in Los Angeles where they met Dean Martin, Jerry Lewis, and Elvis Presley.

Ambler lives near Chipping Norton, Oxfordshire, in the UK. Apart from taking part in family events and milestones, she does not have any official role or obligations either on behalf of Sweden or the royal family.

Titles, styles and honours

 31 October 1934 – 30 June 1964: Her Royal Highness Princess Margaretha of Sweden
 30 June 1964 – present: Princess Margaretha, Mrs. Ambler

National honours
 : Member of the Royal Order of the Seraphim (LoK av KMO)

Foreign honours
 : Grand Cross of the Order of Merit of the Federal Republic of Germany, 1st Class
 : Recipient of the Wedding Medal of Princess Beatrix, Princess of Orange and Claus Van Amsberg

Ancestry

See also
Swedish Royal Family

References

1934 births
Living people
Margaretha 1934
House of Bernadotte
People from Solna Municipality
Disinherited European royalty
Swedish people of German descent